Pseudohemiodon apithanos is a species of armored catfish endemic to Ecuador where it occurs in the San Miguel River basin. (Kasaraset)  This species grows to a length of  SL.

References
 

Loricariini
Fish of South America
Freshwater fish of Ecuador
Taxa named by Isaäc J. H. Isbrücker
Taxa named by Han Nijssen
Fish described in 1978